Demi Schuurs (born 1 August 1993) is a professional Dutch tennis player who has specialized in doubles.

She has won 15 doubles titles on the WTA Tour, as well as one singles title and 20 doubles titles on the ITF Circuit. In February 2015, she reached a career-high singles ranking of world No. 512. On 22 October 2018, she peaked at No. 7 in the WTA doubles rankings.

Juniors
Schuurs won the junior events of the doubles tournaments at 2011 Australian Open and 2011 US Open.

Professional career
She qualified for the 2018 WTA Finals doubles event, partnering Elise Mertens where she reached the quarterfinals.

In 2022, she qualified for her fourth WTA Finals in a row with a fourth different partner, Desirae Krawczyk.

Personal life
Schuurs is a daughter of former Dutch international handball player Lambert Schuurs. Her younger brother Perr is a professional football player.

During an interview with the WTA in 2020, Schuurs revealed that she is in a relationship with a woman named Carmen.

Performance timeline

Doubles

WTA 1000 finals

Doubles: 10 (4 titles, 6 runner-ups)

WTA career finals

Doubles: 30 (15 titles, 15 runner-ups)

ITF Circuit finals

Singles: 2 (1–1)

Doubles: 27 (20–7)

Junior Grand Slam finals

Doubles: 4 (2 titles, 2 runner–ups)

References

External links

 
 
 

1993 births
Living people
LGBT tennis players
Dutch LGBT sportspeople
People from Echt-Susteren
Dutch female tennis players
US Open (tennis) junior champions
Grand Slam (tennis) champions in girls' doubles
Olympic tennis players of the Netherlands
Tennis players at the 2020 Summer Olympics
21st-century LGBT people
Sportspeople from Limburg (Netherlands)